

Gislhere (died  785) was an English Bishop of Selsey in the eighth century.

In 780 Gislhere witnessed a charter of Ealdorman Oslac of Sussex.

Gislhere was present at the Synod of Brentford, Middlesex, in 781.

Gislhere was consecrated between 772 and 780, and died between 781 and 787.

Citations

References

External links
 

Bishops of Selsey
8th-century English bishops